Paremhat 18 - Coptic Calendar - Paremhat 20

The nineteenth day of the Coptic month of Paremhat, the seventh month of the Coptic year. In common years, this day corresponds to March 15, of the Julian Calendar, and March 28, of the Gregorian Calendar. This day falls in the Coptic Season of Shemu, the season of the Harvest.

Commemorations

Apostles 

 The martyrdom of Saint Aristobulus, one of the Seventy Apostles

Martyrs 

 The martyrdom of Saints Alexander, Agabius, and their companions

References 

Days of the Coptic calendar